Margo Reed (c. 1942 – April 15, 2015) was an American blues singer and the sister of blues singer Francine Reed.

In 2000, Margo Reed was named Female Vocalist of the Year by Arizona Jazz magazine. She was inducted into the Arizona Blues Hall of Fame in 2004 and received the Jazz in Arizona Lifetime Achievement Award in 2008.

References

External links 
Arizona Blues Hall of Fame Website

American women jazz singers
American jazz singers
2015 deaths
1942 births
21st-century American women